Capnoptycha ipnitis is a species of moth of the family Tortricidae. It is found in Australia, where it has been recorded from Queensland and New South Wales.

The wingspan is about 12 mm. The forewings are fuscous, the median area suffused with whitish. There is a fuscous basal patch, containing several fine dark-fuscous transverse lines. The hindwings are grey.

References

Moths described in 1910
Epitymbiini